National Route 160 is a national highway of Japan connecting Nanao, Ishikawa and Takaoka, Toyama in Japan, with a total length of .

See also

References

160
Roads in Ishikawa Prefecture
Roads in Toyama Prefecture